South Bradenton is an unincorporated community and census-designated place (CDP) in Manatee County, Florida, United States. The population was 26,858 at the 2020 census, up from 22,178 in 2010. It is part of the Bradenton–Sarasota–Venice Metropolitan Statistical Area.

Geography
South Bradenton is bordered to the north and west by the city of Bradenton, to the south by Bayshore Gardens, and to the east by West Samoset.

Demographics

As of the census of 2000, there were 21,587 people, 10,681 households, and 5,522 families residing in the CDP. The racial makeup of the CDP was 89.92% White, 4.62% African American, 0.32% Native American, 1.31% Asian, 0.10% Pacific Islander, 2.17% from other races, and 1.58% from two or more races. Hispanic or Latino of any race were 8.66% of the population.

There were 10,681 households, out of which 18.1% had children under the age of 18 living with them, 36.9% were married couples living together, 10.8% had a female householder with no husband present, and 48.3% were non-families. 40.4% of all households were made up of individuals, and 20.2% had someone living alone who was 65 years of age or older.  The average household size was 2.00 and the average family size was 2.64.

In the CDP, the population was spread out, with 17.5% under the age of 18, 8.2% from 18 to 24, 25.2% from 25 to 44, 20.4% from 45 to 64, and 28.7% who were 65 years of age or older.  The median age was 44 years. For every 100 females, there were 87.7 males.  For every 100 females age 18 and over, there were 84.9 males.

The median income for a household in the CDP was $27,410, and the median income for a family was $32,444. Males had a median income of $25,011 versus $21,559 for females. The per capita income for the CDP was $17,549.  About 9.5% of families and 13.0% of the population were below the poverty line, including 18.2% of those under age 18 and 5.9% of those age 65 or over.

References

Census-designated places in Manatee County, Florida
Sarasota metropolitan area
Census-designated places in Florida